Cathal Forde (born 4 November 2001) is an Irish rugby union player, currently playing for United Rugby Championship and EPCR Challenge Cup side Connacht. He plays as a fly-half.

Connacht
Forde was named as a member of the Connacht academy for the 2021–22 season. He made his debut for Connacht in Round 11 of the 2021–22 United Rugby Championship against .
He scored his first 2 tries against Cell C Sharks in the Sportsground on January 7, 2023, and was named URC player of the match.

References

External links
itsrugby.co.uk Profile

2001 births
Living people
Irish rugby union players
Connacht Rugby players
Rugby union fly-halves